Regina Bruins (born 7 October 1986, in Leiderdorp) is a Dutch professional racing cyclist. She announced a hiatus from cycling following diagnosis with pulmonary embolism in 2012, but late in 2013 announced she would return with the second-category  team in 2014.

Career wins

2007
Dolmans Heuvelland Classic, Sibbe (NED)
 2nd  Time trial, National Road Championships
2008
 3rd  Road race, National Road Championships
2009
 1st  Time trial, National Road Championships
 Stage 3, Tour du Grand Montréal
Open de Suede Vargarda TTT
2010
Open de Suede Vargarda TTT
 2nd  Time trial, National Road Championships

References

External links

1986 births
Living people
Dutch female cyclists
People from Leiderdorp
Dutch track cyclists
Dutch cycling time trial champions
UCI Road World Championships cyclists for the Netherlands
Cyclists from South Holland
21st-century Dutch women